The Rural Municipality of Leask No. 464 is a rural municipality (RM) in the Canadian province of Saskatchewan within Census Division No. 16 and  Division No. 5. It is located west of the City of Prince Albert.

History 
The RM of Leask No. 464 incorporated as a rural municipality on December 9, 1912.

Geography 
The RM of Leask No. 464 is adjacent to the RMs of Duck Lake No. 463 to the east, Shellbrook No. 493 to the northeast, Blaine Lake No. 434 to the south, Redberry No. 435 to the southwest, and Spiritwood No. 496 to the west.

Communities and localities 
The following urban municipalities are surrounded by the RM.

Villages
Leask
Parkside

The following unincorporated communities are within the RM.

Organized hamlets
Pelican Cove

Localities
Pebble Baye

Mistawasis 103 and several separate reserves of the Muskeg Lake Cree Nation are also surrounded by the RM.

Demographics 

Government 
The RM of Leask No. 464 is governed by an elected municipal council and an appointed administrator that meets on the second Wednesday of every month. The reeve of the RM is Len Cantin while its administrator is Judy Douglas. The RM's office is located in Leask.

See also 
List of rural municipalities in Saskatchewan

References 

Leask

Division No. 16, Saskatchewan